Harington is a Metropolitan Borough of Sefton ward in the Sefton Central Parliamentary constituency that covers the western half of the town of Formby including the western half of the area known as Freshfield. The ward population taken at the 2011 census was 11,780.

Current Councillors
Denise Dutton 2010 to present (Conservative Party) - Deputy Leader of Conservative Group in Sefton Council.

Simon Jamieson 2015 to present (Conservative Party).

Prof Michael Pitt 2016 to present (Conservative Party).

Denise Dutton was formerly the leader of the Conservative group in Sefton Council, while Simon Jamieson was the deputy. In May 2018, Jamieson became embroiled in an online row in which he labelled a student a "lefty pleb". Shortly after, he was removed from his post as deputy, with Dutton taking his place.

Historic Election results

Elections of the 2010s

References

Wards of the Metropolitan Borough of Sefton
Formby